Michael Obiora  (born 8 October 1986) is a British actor, writer, director, and producer.

Early life
Michael Obiora (pronounced OH-BEE-ORA) was born on 8 October 1986 in north-west London, England, to Nigerian-Igbo parents. As a six-year-old, he was determined to become an entertainer like his idol Michael Jackson, and his mother enrolled him in drama lessons. He describes having challenging teen years, as he was badly injured, then expelled from secondary school before his GCSEs, and then his father passed away.

Career
At the age of nine, Obiora became the youngest actor to have appeared in Grange Hill; he played Max Abassi on the programme for five years.

Just before his 18th birthday, Obiora landed a role playing the part of Gunner Jackson Clarke, a soldier in ITV's eight-part series Bombshell, starring opposite Footballers Wives star Zöe Lucker. 

Shortly after filming Bombshell, Obiora started a seven-month run as one of the leads in the award-winning play Elmina's Kitchen, written by Kwame Kwei-Armah, at the Garrick Theatre. Elmina's Kitchen is only the second play in history written by a writer of African descent to be staged in the West End. Obiora also had the lead role in the stage play Exclude Me, completing a successful 11-week run on stage at The Chelsea Theatre, and lead roles in the plays Fallout starring opposite Lennie James, at the Royal Court Theatre, Badnuff starring opposite David Harewood, at The Soho Theatre, and Headstone at the Arcola Theatre.

Obiora has had television roles in My Family, Judge John Deed, Misfits, Sea of Souls, ITV1's Afterlife , Doctor Who ("Blink") - his portrayal of Carey Mulligan's love interest, Di Billy Shipton, was critically acclaimed, and the episode has been voted in the Top 5 best ever. Obiora has also starred in Doctors, Powers, The Bill for five episodes as Nathan Morley, and Holby City. He was in four episodes of EastEnders; the first episode airing on 11 June 2009, in which he played playboy footballer, Ellis Prince.

Obiora became hugely recognisable when he played receptionist Ben Trueman in the BBC One drama series Hotel Babylon, which ran for four seasons. He joined the cast of the long-running BAFTA winning medical drama Casualty for its 26th season playing the part of Lloyd Asike, a nurse. He spent two years on the show. Alongside Stanley Tucci, Sofie Gråbøl, Michael Gambon, and Christopher Eccleston, Obiora was part of an international ensemble that formed the cast of Sky Atlantic's critically acclaimed 2015 epic eleven-part crime thriller, Fortitude. The series was filmed over six months in Iceland. In 2016, he travelled to South Africa to film Hooten & the Lady, in which he played Julian. 
On 18 January 2017 Obiora made an appearance in Midsomer Murders on ITV as Oliver Marcet in the episode "Red in Tooth and Claw." Later that year, Obiora played Dr Harwood in the Channel 4 comedy pilot titled Anxio(US), and he starred in the television remake of Guy Ritchie's Snatch as New York jewelry dealer Nas Stone. In 2018 he played Baxter in the Tomb Raider reboot, with the film grossing $275 million at the box office. Later that year he played Ed in the short film Downtime.
Obiora starred opposite Idris Elba as Errol Minty in the Golden Globe-winning Luther between 2015 and 2019. In 2021, Obiora appeared as a charismatic American preacher in the RTS nominated BBC comedy series Jerk.

Obiora made his directorial debut with the short film Soaperstar in 2020, which he also wrote and starred in. It was the recipient of the Film Short: Award of Recognition, and an Award of Merit: Best Actor for Obiora, at the Best Shorts Awards 2020. It also won a Best Actor award for Obiora at the Europe Film Festival 2020, as well as being officially selected for screening at the Pan African Film Festival 2021. In 2021, Obiora had his second directorial outing with the short film KARMArcus. He also wrote and starred in the film, and was awarded Best Actor at the London Movie Awards 2021 for his role as Marcus. KARMArcus also won the award for Outstanding Short Script at the Black Swan International Film Festival 2022.

Michael is also a hugely successful voiceover artist having voiced campaigns for Adidas, and Jacamo among many others. He narrated the popular London to Lagos: Lifestyles of The Super Rich documentary broadcast on Channel 4, and he has narrated many audiobooks including Sarah Burns' critically acclaimed The Central Park Five: The Untold Story Behind One of New York City’s Most Infamous Crimes, Courttia Newland's speculative sci-fi fantasy novel A River Called Time, and Nobel Prize for Literature great Wole Soyinka's Chronicles from the Land of the Happiest People on Earth. This was Soyinka's first novel in 25 years. Michael is also one of the narrators of Geraldine Brooks' historical fiction novel, Horse. Along with the other narrators Michael won an Earphone Award for his work on the audiobook.
Obiora is also the voice of Chike in the popular American cartoon series Robozuna, on Netflix.

Obiora played DS Watende Robinson in the BBC Radio 4 detective drama Craven from 2009 to 2014. The show also starred Maxine Peake, and was written by Amelia Bullmore.

Obiora's first novel, Black Shoes, was released in 2009. Michael published his second novel Vivian's Couch in November 2014.

Personal life
Obiora is a sports and fitness enthusiast and is a keen Arsenal fan. 
In 2008 he was diagnosed with celiac disease and has thus had to control his diet.

In 2014, Obiora married his long term partner in a beach wedding ceremony in her native the Seychelles. They welcomed their first child in May 2020.

Appearances

Audiobooks

See also
 List of people diagnosed with coeliac disease

References

External links
 

1986 births
Living people
Male actors from London
English male television actors
English male stage actors
English male child actors
Black British male actors
Black British writers
English people of Igbo descent
Igbo male actors
People from the London Borough of Camden